Palazzo del Capitano del Popolo may refer to: 

Palazzo del Capitano del Popolo, Gubbio
Palazzo del Capitano del Popolo, Orvieto in Orvieto
Palazzo del Capitano del Popolo, Reggio Emilia
Palazzo del Capitano del Popolo, Siena